Jean Moulin (15 March 1905 – 2 October 1988) was a Luxembourgian sprinter. He competed in the men's 100 metres at the 1928 Summer Olympics.

References

1905 births
1988 deaths
Athletes (track and field) at the 1928 Summer Olympics
Luxembourgian male sprinters
Olympic athletes of Luxembourg
Sportspeople from Luxembourg City